East Central Junior College may refer to:

East Central College, in Union, Missouri 
East Central Community College, in Decatur, Mississippi